Zhou Jun may refer to:

Zhou Jun (botanist) (1932–2020), Chinese botanist
Zhou Jun (weightlifter) (born 1995), Chinese weightlifter